Huanca Sancos is a town in southern Peru, capital of the province Huanca Sancos in the region Ayacucho.

References

Populated places in the Ayacucho Region